The Stripefin poacher (Xeneretmus ritteri) is a fish in the family Agonidae. It was described by Charles Henry Gilbert in 1915. It is a marine, deep water-dwelling fish which is known from the eastern central Pacific Ocean, including southern California, USA; Baja California, Mexico; and an isolated population in the Gulf of California. It dwells at a depth range of 183–366 metres, and inhabits soft benthic sediments. Males can reach a maximum total length of 16 centimetres.

The stripefin poacher is preyed on by the California sea lion.

References

Stripefin poacher
Fish described in 1915